Vokzalnaya Square  (Ukrainian: Вокзальная площа) is a square in the Novozavodsky district of Chernihiv near the Chernihiv–Ovruch railway, the beginning of Pobeda Avenue. Privokzalnaya Street joins in the north.

History
It was planned in the 1960s on the site of a former park. Reconstruction of the area is planned.

Description
Traffic is not regulated by traffic lights. The central part of the square is occupied by a round flower bed. Adjacent to the railway station and bus station №1, grocery store.

The composition of the square is completed by the building of the railway station (1948) - a monument of architecture of local significance. A memorial plaque in honor of Chernihiv underground heroes (1941-1945, 2001) is attached to the station building.

The area is surrounded by non-residential buildings, in the north there is a manor house (Privokzalnaya Street).

Transport
trolleybus routes № 1, 3, 5 stop Railway station on Pobeda Avenue.

See also
List of streets and squares in Chernihiv
Chernihiv–Ovruch railway
Central Bus Station

References

External links
 wikimapia.org

Squares in Chernihiv